200 Million Thousand is the fifth studio album by garage punk band Black Lips. The album was recorded in August 2008 and released on February 24, 2009, in the United States and March 16 in Europe. The first single, "Short Fuse" was released on March 9, 2009.

Track listing
 "Take My Heart" (Alexander)
 "Drugs" (Swilley)
 "Starting Over" (Alexander)
 "Let It Grow" (Alexander)
 "Trapped in a Basement" (Bradley)
 "Short Fuse" (Bradley)
 "I'll Be With You" (Swilley)
 "Big Black Baby Jesus of Today" (Alexander)
 "Again & Again" (Osterberg)
 "Old Man" (Bradley)
 "The Drop I Hold" (Alexander)
 "Body Combat" (Swilley)Naunsa
 "Elijah" (Alexander)
 "I Saw God" (Alexander)
 "Meltdown" (Hidden Track)

"Again & Again" is a cover version of an Iggy Pop song, published under his real name (Jim Osterberg), and originally recorded with his first band The Iguanas in 1965.

References

Black Lips albums
2009 albums
Vice Records albums